Margarita Escarpa (born 21 August 1964) 
is a Spanish classical guitarist.

Escarpa was born in Madrid. She studied at the Real Conservatorio Superior de Madrid and is currently on the faculty at the Vigo Conservatory and is a well-known professional in Spain. She is noted for her performances of Bach and chamber music recitals and has performed internationally including in the United States and Mexico.

References

External links
Official site

1964 births
Living people
Madrid Royal Conservatory alumni
Spanish classical guitarists
Spanish women guitarists
Women classical guitarists